8 Women is a 2002 dark comedy musical film written and directed by François Ozon. Based on the 1958 play by Robert Thomas, it features an ensemble cast of high-profile French actresses that includes Catherine Deneuve, Isabelle Huppert, Emmanuelle Béart, Fanny Ardant, Virginie Ledoyen, Danielle Darrieux, Ludivine Sagnier and Firmine Richard. Revolving around an eccentric family of women and their employees in the 1950s, the film follows eight women as they gather to celebrate Christmas in an isolated, snowbound cottage only to find Marcel, the family patriarch, dead with a knife in his back. Trapped in the house, every woman becomes a suspect, each having her own motive and secret.

Ozon initially envisioned a remake of George Cukor's film The Women (1939), but eventually settled on Thomas's Huit femmes after legal obstacles prevented him from doing so. Drawing inspiration from Cukor's screwball comedies of the late 1930s and the 1950s work of directors such as Douglas Sirk, Vincente Minnelli, and Alfred Hitchcock, 8 Women blends farce, melodrama, musical, and murder-mystery film while addressing murder, greed, adultery, and homosexuality. Set primarily in the entry hall of a manor house, the film recreates much of the play's original theatrical feel. It also serves as a pastiche of and homage to the history of film and the actresses' filmographies.

The film's premiere was held on 8 January 2002 in Paris, where filming had taken place. 8 Women competed for the Golden Bear at the 52nd Berlin International Film Festival, where its all-female cast was awarded a Silver Bear for outstanding artistic contribution. Released to generally positive reviews, with major praise for the stars, the film was nominated for twelve César Awards, including Best Film. At the 2002 European Film Awards, the film was nominated for six awards, including Best Film and Best Director; it won for Best Actress for the eight principal actresses. It was also selected as the French entry for the Best Foreign Language Film category at the 75th Academy Awards, but was not nominated.

Plot
The film is set in the 1950s in a large country residence as a family and its servants are preparing for Christmas. When the master of the house is discovered dead in his bed with a dagger in his back, it is presumed that the murderer must be one of the eight women in the house. Over the course of the investigation, each woman has a tale to tell and secrets to hide.

The film opens with Suzon returning from school for Christmas break, finding her mother Gaby, her younger sister Catherine, and her wheelchair-bound grandmother Mamy in the living room, where most of the action of the film takes place. Their conversation drifts to the subject of the patriarch of the family, Marcel, and Catherine leads the first song of the film, "Papa t'es plus dans le coup" (roughly, "Dad, you're out of touch"). The singing wakes up Suzon and Catherine's aunt Augustine, who initiates arguments with the rest of the family and the two servants (Madame Chanel and Louise), eventually returning upstairs and threatening to commit suicide. Mamy jumps out of her wheelchair trying to stop her, haphazardly explaining her ability to walk as a "Christmas miracle." Augustine is eventually calmed down, and she sings her song of longing, "Message personnel" (Personal Message).

The maid takes a tray upstairs, finds Marcel's stabbed body, and screams. Catherine goes up to see what has happened and locks the door. The others finally go up to Marcel's room to see him stabbed in the back. Catherine tells the others that they should not disturb the room until the police arrive, so they re-lock the door. Realizing that the dogs did not bark the night before the incident, it becomes clear that the murderer was known to the dogs and therefore must be one of the women in the house. Attempting to call the authorities, they find that the telephone line has been cut, so they will have to go in person to the police station. Before they can do so, the women are distracted by the announcement that someone is roaming the garden, someone whom the guard dogs are not chasing. The person turns out to be Marcel's sister Pierrette, a nightclub singer who is also rumored to be a prostitute, and who has not been allowed into the house before due to Gaby's dislike for her. When questioned, she claims that she received a mysterious telephone call in which she was informed that her brother was dead. She sings "A quoi sert de vivre libre" (What's the point of living free?), commenting on her sexual freedom.

It is realized that she has been to the house before, as the dogs did not bark and she knew immediately which room belonged to her brother, making her the eighth potential killer. The women try to start the car, and find that it has been sabotaged, cutting them off from help until the storm subsides and they can hitchhike to town. The women spend their time trying to identify the murderer amongst them. It is learned that Suzon returned the night before to tell her father in secret that she was pregnant. She sings a song to Catherine, "Mon amour, mon ami" ("My Lover, My Friend"), about her lover; however, she was sexually abused by her father. We later learn that Suzon is not Marcel's child but is the child of Gaby's first great love who was killed not long after the child was conceived; every time Gaby looks at Suzon, she is reminded of her love for him.

Suspicion then swings to Madame Chanel, the housekeeper, whose actions the night before seem suspicious. It is revealed that she had been having an affair with Pierrette, who went to see her brother that night to ask for money to pay off her debts. When some members of the family react in outrage to the fact that she is a lesbian, Madame Chanel retreats to the kitchen, and sings "Pour ne pas vivre seul" (So as to not live alone).

In the meantime, we find out that Mamy, Suzon and Catherine's "old and sick" grandmother, not only can walk but also possesses some valuable stock shares that could have saved Marcel from his bankruptcy. Out of greed, she lied that her shares had been stolen by someone who knew where she was hiding them. The spotlight moves to Louise, the new maid, who is found out to be Marcel's mistress. She declares affection for Gaby, but also expresses disappointment in her for her weakness and indecision. She sings "Pile ou face" (literally "Heads or Tails", but referring to the ups and downs of life), and removes the symbols of her servitude, her maid's cap and apron, asserting herself as an equal to the other women. Gaby sings "Toi Jamais" (Never You), about Marcel, saying that he never paid enough attention to her, while other men did. It is revealed that she had an affair with Marcel's business partner, Jacques Farneaux, the same man who has been having an affair with Pierrette. The two women get into a fight that turns into a passionate make-out session on the living room floor, a scene which the others walk in on and are stunned by.

Eventually, Madame Chanel discovers the solution to the mystery, but she is silenced by a gunshot. While not struck by the bullet, she becomes mute out of shock. Catherine takes the lead, revealing that she hid in her father's closet from where she saw all the other women talk to Marcel the night before. She explains the mystery: Marcel faked his own death, with her help, to see what was really going on in his house. She says that he is now free of the other women's clutches and rushes to his bedroom only to witness Marcel shoot himself in the head. Mamy closes the film with the song "Il n'y a pas d'amour heureux" (There is no happy love) as the women clasp hands and face the audience.

Cast
 Danielle Darrieux as Mamy, the matriarch
 Isabelle Huppert as Augustine, her tachycardiac daughter
 Catherine Deneuve as Gaby, her other daughter, the victim's wife
 Fanny Ardant as Pierrette, the victim's sister
 Emmanuelle Béart as Louise, the new chambermaid
 Virginie Ledoyen as Suzon, the victim's elder daughter
 Ludivine Sagnier as Catherine, the victim's younger daughter
 Firmine Richard as Madame Chanel, the cook
 Dominique Lamure as Marcel, the victim, Gaby's husband
 Romy Schneider (via photograph) as the chambermaid's previous mistress

Musical numbers
 "Papa t'es plus dans le coup" ("Dad, You're Out of Touch") – Catherine and Company
 "Message personnel" ("Personal Message") – Augustine
 "A quoi sert de vivre libre" ("What's the Point of Living Free?") – Pierrette
 "Mon amour, mon ami" ("My Lover, My Friend") – Suzon
 "Pour ne pas vivre seul" ("So as Not to Live Alone") – Madame Chanel
 "Pile ou face" ("Heads or Tails / Ups and Downs") – Louise
 "Toi jamais" ("Never You") – Gaby
 "Il n'y a pas d'amour heureux" ("There is No Happy Love") – Mamy

Production
Ozon was inspired by the 1950s Ross Hunter productions of Douglas Sirk and Alfred Hitchcock. To achieve the look of the latter two director's films, Ozon had costume designer Pascaline Chavanne fashion an original costume for each character. Chavanne was inspired by Dior's New Look and the earlier film costumes of Edith Head. Composer Krishna Levy also provided an instrumental score evocative of Bernard Herrmann, with touches of Miklós Rózsa and Elmer Bernstein, as well as a soundtrack featuring eight songs performed unexpectedly by the film's title characters.
Principal Photography took place from April 9 to June 9, 2001 at the Aubervilliers studios

Reception

Critical response

8 Women received generally positive reviews from critics. The review aggregator website Rotten Tomatoes reported that 79% of critics gave the film a positive rating, based on 124 reviews, with an average score of 7/10. Its consensus states "Featuring some of the best French actresses working today, 8 Women is frothy, delirious, over-the-top fun." On Metacritic, the film holds a 64/100 rating, based on 30 reviews, indicating "generally favorable reviews".

Jonathan Curiel of the San Francisco Chronicle remarked that 8 Women was "a movie that is so original, so funny, so alive with drama, intrigue, mystery and colors that you want to see it again and again", citing it the "new masterpiece" in Ozon's filmography. Roger Ebert, writing for the Chicago Sun-Times, gave 8 Women three out of four stars. He noted that the film "is in no sense serious about murder, its plot, or anything else. It's an elaborate excuse to have fun with its cast," adding: "Watching 8 Women, you have a silly grin half of the time." He concluded that "Movies like 8 Women are essentially made for movie-lovers. You have to have seen overdecorated studio musicals, and you have to know who Darrieux and Deneuve and Beart and Huppert and Ardant are, to get the full flavor." Lisa Schwarzbaum from Entertainment Weekly felt that "what does matter is that a phalanx of France's most famous actresses play a gay peekaboo with their own images in the guise of replicating a '50s technicolored production. The result is weightless entertainment that's both camp and true, a warped adoration of star-quality actresses as amazing creatures who can project the lives of fictional characters as well as the essence of their own fabulous selves. Hollywood, start your remake."

The Washington Post writer Ann Hornaday called the film "a gorgeous, if disjointed, spectacle, made endurable—if not entirely comprehensible—by its eye-popping cast." She found that the picture "retains a stagy quality of heightened theatricality" and that "with its bold, luxurious palette and hard-candy surfaces, the film seems less photographed than forged out of silk and nail lacquer." Rolling Stones Peter Travers concurred: "All eight women are something to see and marvel at. Whatever you call this one-of-a-kind bonbon spiked with wit and malice, it's classic oo-la-la." He rated the comedy three out of four stars. A. O. Scott from The New York Times said, "The high-minded critical term of art for such a decadent delight is 'guilty pleasure,' but a movie like this reveals that stuffy phrase to be both a redundancy and an oxymoron. 8 Women is indefensible, cynical, even grotesque; it is also pure—that is to say innocent and uncorrupted—fun." Less enthusiastic with the film, Salon.com wrote that "despite the all-star cast of beautiful, talented actresses, this French whodunit never lives up to the grand musicals it rips off."

Specific performances were cited for acclaim. Huppert's portrayal of Augustine was met with praise. Curiel wrote that "Huppert's song and dance—and her whole performance in the movie—is a study in determination. Huppert has a reputation for her intense portrayals, and in 8 Women, she steals every scene she's in as the uptight, melodramatic, bespectacled aunt." Ardant also received praise for her performance with Hornaday saying that "the showstopper is Ardant, who in a sensational turn combining the earthiness of Ava Gardner and the fire of Rita Hayworth, explodes with an elemental force all her own. Ardant alone is worth the price of admission to 8 Women."

Box office
The film was released on 6 February 2002 in France and opened at #3 in 493 theaters, grossing $5,246,358 in the opening weekend. It grossed $18,991,866 in the domestic market. The film's international gross was in total $42,426,583.

Accolades

See also
 Isabelle Huppert on screen and stage
 List of Christmas films

References

External links
 
 
 
 
 

2002 films
2002 black comedy films
2002 independent films
2002 LGBT-related films
2000s Christmas comedy films
2000s comedy mystery films
2000s French films
2000s French-language films
2000s Italian films
2000s musical comedy films
Films about dysfunctional families
Films directed by François Ozon
Films featuring an all-female cast
Films set in country houses
Films set in the 1950s
Films shot in France
Films whose director won the Best Director Lumières Award
French black comedy films
French Christmas comedy films
French comedy mystery films
French films based on plays
French independent films
French LGBT-related films
French musical comedy films
French-language Italian films
Italian black comedy films
Italian Christmas comedy films
Italian comedy mystery films
Italian films based on plays
Italian independent films
Italian LGBT-related films
Italian musical comedy films
Jukebox musical films
Lesbian-related films
LGBT-related black comedy films
LGBT-related musical comedy films
Murder mystery films
Silver Bear for outstanding artistic contribution